is a Japanese model and professional boxer who challenged once for the WBO junior bantamweight title in 2015.

Professional boxing record

References

External links
 
Asian Boxing Profile of Tomomi Takano

1987 births
Japanese women boxers
Japanese female models
People from Tokyo
Bantamweight boxers
Living people
Models from Tokyo Metropolis